Gökmen Yıldıran (31 August 1978 – 9 August 2006) was a Turkish footballer who played professionally in Turkey. He died after suffering a heart attack during training.

Career statistics

Club

Notes

References

1978 births
2006 deaths
Turkish footballers
Turkey youth international footballers
Association football forwards
MKE Ankaragücü footballers
Vanspor footballers
Altay S.K. footballers
Adanaspor footballers
İstanbulspor footballers
Elazığspor footballers
Süper Lig players
TFF First League players
TFF Second League players
TFF Third League players
Sport deaths in Turkey
Association football players who died while playing
Footballers from Istanbul